{{DISPLAYTITLE:C21H36O2}}
The molecular formula C21H36O2 may refer to:

 Allopregnanediol, or 5α-pregnane-3α,20α-diol, a steroid
 Adipostatin A, an alkylresorcinol
 Pregnanediol, a steroid

Molecular formulas